Moataz Tombakti (born 13 May 1994) is a Saudi Arabian footballer who plays for Al-Lewaa as a defensive midfielder.

References

External links
 

Living people
1994 births
Saudi Arabian footballers
Saudi Arabia youth international footballers
Association football midfielders
Al-Wehda Club (Mecca) players
Ittihad FC players
Al-Fayha FC players
Ohod Club players
Al-Ain FC (Saudi Arabia) players
Al-Shoulla FC players
Najran SC players
Al-Lewaa Club players
Saudi First Division League players
Saudi Professional League players
Saudi Second Division players
Sportspeople from Mecca